Kobkarn Wattanavrangkul (born 19 September 1960) is a former Thai politician. She served as Minister of Tourism and Sports in the first cabinet of Prime Minister Prayut Chan-o-cha.

, she serves as chairperson of the board of Kasikornbank.

References 

Living people
1960 births
Kobkarn Wattanavrangkul
Kobkarn Wattanavrangkul
Kobkarn Wattanavrangkul
Kobkarn Wattanavrangkul
Kobkarn Wattanavrangkul
Kobkarn Wattanavrangkul
Kobkarn Wattanavrangkul